Linus Straßer (born 6 November 1992) is a German World Cup alpine ski racer, a slalom specialist. His first qualification for a World Cup second run came in a giant slalom at Beaver Creek in December 2014, but he failed to finish. Straßer has competed in four World Championships; in his first in 2015 at Beaver Creek, he was in tenth in the slalom. His first World Cup podium was a victory in a parallel slalom race in Stockholm in January 2017.

World cup results

Season standings

Race podiums
 3 wins – (2 SL, 1 PSL)
 10 podiums – (7 SL, 3 PSL)

World Championships results

Olympic results

References

External links

1992 births
German male alpine skiers
Living people
Skiers from Munich
TSV 1860 Munich
Olympic alpine skiers of Germany
Alpine skiers at the 2018 Winter Olympics
Alpine skiers at the 2022 Winter Olympics
Medalists at the 2022 Winter Olympics
Olympic medalists in alpine skiing
Olympic silver medalists for Germany
21st-century German people